American singer Deborah Harry has released five studio albums, five compilation albums and 24 singles. Until 1988, Harry used her nickname "Debbie" on all releases but she is now known professionally as Deborah Harry.

Albums

Studio albums

Compilation albums

Singles

As lead artist

As featured artist

Other contributions

Notes

References

Discography
Discographies of American artists
Pop music discographies
Rock music discographies